Polytrichadelphus mitis is a species of moss first discovered by Theodor Carl Karl Julius Herzog in 1927. No sub-species are listed in Catalogue of Life.

References
	

Polytrichaceae